Hesar-e Sati (also Romanized as Ḩeşār-e Sātī, Hesār-e-Sātī, Ḩeşār Sātī, and Hisār Sathi) is a village in Juqin Rural District, in the Central District of Shahriar County, Tehran Province, Iran. At the 2006 census, its population was 1,052, in 276 families.

References 

Populated places in Shahriar County